Kringlebotn is a Norwegian surname. Notable people with the surname include:

Berge Helle Kringlebotn (1904–1992), Norwegian politician
Johannes Kringlebotn (1898–1959), Norwegian newspaper editor
Solveig Kringlebotn (born 1963), Norwegian operatic soprano

Norwegian-language surnames